Bescot Stadium railway station serves the Bescot area of Walsall in the West Midlands of England. (The station is located in the borough of Sandwell, although it can only be reached from within the borough of Walsall.) The station, and most trains serving it are operated by West Midlands Railway with some services being operated by London Northwestern Railway.

History

An earlier station was opened nearby as Bescot Bridge in 1837 by the Grand Junction Railway but was later renamed .

A station was subsequently opened as Bescot on the current site on 1 May 1850, it was renamed to Bescot Junction in August 1850.

The line through the station was electrified in 1966 as part of the London Midland Region's electrification programme. The actual energization of the line from Coventry to Walsall through Aston took place on 15 August 1966.

It was renamed  Bescot Stadium in 1990 in order to serve Bescot Stadium, the newly built home of Walsall Football Club.

The station was re-opened on 11 September 2007 after a short period where it was closed for refurbishment. Whilst closed, no services called at the station, but trains continued to pass through.

Incidents 

On 8 December 1854 a South Staffordshire Railway passenger train from Walsall, hauled by a LNWR engine struck the corner of a goods waggon, which was projecting from a siding towards the main line. The wagon then struck the engine's tender, and four of the following carriages, derailing and badly damaging them. One passenger died and over 20 more were in injured.

Services
Bescot Stadium station is on the Walsall Line between Birmingham New Street and Walsall. The typical Monday-Saturday daytime service sees three trains per hour in each direction. Southbound via Birmingham New Street there is one service per hour to London Euston and two stopping services per hour to Wolverhampton; with some services extended to/from Shrewsbury. Northbound, three trains per hour operate to Walsall with one continuing to Rugeley Trent Valley.

On Sundays and during the evenings, services are reduced.

Services are usually operated by Class 350 EMU or Class 323 EMU. Services to/from Shrewsbury are operated using Class 170 DMU.

The station footbridge offers views of Bescot Yard, and its freight movements. Bescot TMD is adjacent to the station.

Access to the station is via Bescot Crescent (where there is a car park) and then a footpath which passes underneath the M6 motorway and over the River Tame, then an overbridge.

London Midland proposed the closure of the ticket office, but this request was overruled in September 2012 by the Transport Minister.

References

External links

Rail Around Birmingham and the West Midlands: Bescot Stadium railway station

Railway stations in Sandwell
DfT Category E stations
Former London and North Western Railway stations
Railway stations in Great Britain opened in 1837
Railway stations served by West Midlands Trains